The Apostolic Vicariate of Puerto Leguízamo-Solano is a Latin missionary pre-diocesan jurisdiction of the Catholic Church in southern Colombia.

It is exempt, i.e. directly dependent on the Holy See, not part of any ecclesiastical province.

Its cathedral episcopal see is Catedral Nuestra Señora del Carmen, dedicated to Our Lady of Mount Carmel, located in the town of Puerto Leguízamo, in Putumayo department.

History 
On 21 February 2013 Pope Benedict XVI established the Apostolic Vicariate of Puerto Leguízamo–Solano, on territory split off from the then Apostolic Vicariate of San Vicente-Puerto Leguízamo, the remainder of which was soon after renamed the Apostolic Vicariate of San Vicente del Caguán.

Episcopal ordinaries
 Joaquín Humberto Pinzón Güiza, I.M.C. (21 February 2013 – ...), Titular Bishop of Otočac (2013.02.21 – ...)

See also 
 Roman Catholicism in Colombia

Sources

External links 
 GigaCatholic - jurisdiction &  cathedral

Apostolic vicariates
Roman Catholic dioceses in Colombia
Christian organizations established in 2013
2013 establishments in Colombia